The Asian Games is a quadrennial event which began in 1951. The Olympic Council of Asia accepts only athletes who are representing one of the organisation's member states (most of which are within Asia) and recognises records set at editions of the Asian Games. The Games records in athletics are the best marks set in competitions at the Games. The athletics events at the Games are divided into four groups: track events (including sprints, middle- and long-distance running, hurdling and relays), field events (including javelin, discus, hammer, pole vault, long and triple jumps), road events and combined events (the heptathlon and decathlon).

Men's records

Women's records

Notes

References

External links 
Asian Games Records. Asian Athletics Association. Retrieved on 2009-11-09.

Athletics at the Asian Games
Asian Games
Athletics
Asian Games